Jean Dassier (August or October 17, 1676 – November 12, 1763) was a Genevan engraver and medallist.

Dassier was born in Geneva, and his father was the official Mint Engraver for the Republic of Geneva. In 1703 Dassier married Anne Prevost-Gaudy, and they had two sons. He studied in Paris with Jean Mauger and Joseph Roettiers, and he became an assistant to his father. In 1712 Dassier was admitted as a master in the guild of goldsmiths. In 1720 he succeeded his father as the official engraver for Geneva. He was appointed to the Council of Two Hundred in 1738. Dassier died on November 12, 1763. 

On his death, his son Jacques-Antoine Dassier took over as the chief engraver of Genevan currency.

References
 Émile Haag: The Protestant France - 1855
 William Eisler: The medals Dassier Skira Geneva 2009 
 Some content translated from the corresponding French Wikipedia article

External links 
 

Engravers from the Republic of Geneva
1676 births
1763 deaths
18th-century artists from the Republic of Geneva
18th-century medallists